Neutrophil immunodeficiency syndrome is a condition caused by mutations in the Rac2 gene.

See also 
 Immunodeficiency with hyper-IgM
 List of cutaneous conditions
 Chronic granulomatous disease

References

External links 

Noninfectious immunodeficiency-related cutaneous conditions
Congenital defects of phagocyte number, function, or both
Syndromes